Bjuråkers GIF  is a sports club in Bjuråker, Sweden, established on 26 November 1952.

The women's soccer team played in the Swedish top division in 1978.

References

External links
Soccer 
Skiing 

Football clubs in Gävleborg County
Sports clubs established in 1952
Defunct ice hockey teams in Sweden
1952 establishments in Sweden
Sport in Gävleborg County
Ski clubs in Sweden